Harpalus longipalmatus is a species of ground beetle in the subfamily Harpalinae. It was described by Mordkovitsh in 1969.

References

longipalmatus
Beetles described in 1969